Montana School for the Deaf & Blind (MSDB) is a boarding K–12 school in Great Falls, Montana, for deaf and blind students.

The school takes full-time students and students who split time between regular school district schools and MSDB.

The dormitories are intended for students living outside of the Great Falls area.

History
In the late 2010s the school had difficulties finding qualified staff. Then the school offered to return $250,000, or 4% of its budget, to the state, but the lawmakers told the school to keep the money. Members of the state Republican Party had a positive reception to the move. In 2019 Bradley Hamlett (D-Cascade), of the Montana House of Representatives, stated that the state should offer more assistance to the school. The Lions Club of Montana held a fundraiser to buy the school prodigi devices, raising $300,000. The Prodigi Connect 12 devices were used for blind students, replacing closed-circuit television and lower quality magnifiers, and therefore facilitated real-time study. In 2018 the club also repaired the playground.

References

External links
 Montana School for the Deaf & Blind

Schools for the blind in the United States
Schools for the deaf in the United States
Public boarding schools in the United States
Boarding schools in Montana
Buildings and structures in Great Falls, Montana
Public K-12 schools in the United States
Public elementary schools in Montana
Public middle schools in Montana
Public high schools in Montana